Phu Wiang National Park (PWNP) is in Khon Kaen Province, northeastern Thailand, covering the area of the Phu Wiang Mountains. It is best known for its numerous dinosaur bone paleontological sites, The park is one of the world's largest dinosaur graveyards. In 1996, the remains of Siamotyrannus isanensis, a new family of carnivorous thunder lizards, were unearthed in the park.

The Phu Wiang Dinosaur Museum in the park displays many of the park's finds. The area is characterized by a central plain and the low hills of the western Phu Phan Mountains.

Topography 
The general topography of the area is a mountain range, shaped as a hollow circle. In the center is a basin. It consists of mountains with moderate slopes to steep slopes. The outermost mountain range has a maximum peak of 844 meters above sea level. The highest peak of the mountain southwest of the area is 470 meters above sea level. The north of the inner mountain area is a source of dinosaur fossils. The lowest level of the foothills is 210 meters above sea level.

Phu Wiang National Park is located on the Khorat plateau. This is caused by the accumulation of sediments on the land that is more than 4,000 meters thick. The sedimentary layer is almost completely red is called the red sediment, or the Khorat stone, consisting of stone units, Khao Phra Wihan, stone pillars, Phu Phan stone and Khok gravel. The rocks were covered with sludge and quaternary clay. In the present day, there is also a survey of the uranium line in the area as well. Phu Wiang National Park is the upstream source of Huai Sai Khao, which flows into Nam Phong Huai Bang, leaving Huai Nam Lai, which will flow into Chern Huai Ruea, Huai Khum Poon, Huai Nam Bon, and Huai Maew, which will flow into Huai Bong, both Nam Phong, Hua Yong. And Chern River flows into Ubol Ratana Dam.

Fauna
Bird species include Black-crested bulbul, Lineated barbet, National bird of Thailand Siamese fireback, Eurasian jay, Common flameback, Green-billed malkoha, Rufescent prinia and Shikra.

There are no large animals but there are small ones include Slow loris, Masked palm civet, Lesser mouse deer, barking deer, Himalayan porcupine, Fishing cat, Large Indian civet and Small Indian civet.

See also
List of national parks of Thailand
List of Protected Areas Regional Offices of Thailand

References

National parks of Thailand
Phu Phan Mountains
IUCN Category II
Tourist attractions in Khon Kaen province
Prehistoric Thailand
Protected areas established in 1965
1965 establishments in Thailand
Cretaceous paleontological sites of Asia